Alberto Ognjen Štriga (1821–1897) was a Croatian reformer, composer and musician.

Štriga was a vocal supporter of Illyrian movement in Croatia. He has played a substantial role in the musical life of that period as an opera singer, the initiator and organizer.  He died in Zagreb on March 7, 1897.

References

Croatian composers
Croatian musicians
1821 births
1897 deaths
19th-century composers
People from Križevci